Six of Cups is a Minor Arcana tarot card.

History
Tarot cards are used throughout much of Europe to play tarot card games.
In English-speaking countries, where the games are largely unknown, Tarot cards came to be utilized primarily for divinatory purposes.

Divination usage
The six of cups in the esoteric use of the card stands for innocence and nostalgia when it is an upright position. When this card is in a reversed position, it represents the themes of being  stuck in the past, naïve, and unrealistic. Another way it has been interpreted is that it means that it is time to look back to a simpler way of thinking. Unquestionable love is a more modern interpretation. The children that are used on the card are there to promote the idea of children being able to hold on to love and to not respond with emotion like adults tend to do.
If the card appears in the reversed position, it indicates a fixation on times which have passed, nostalgia or ruminations on childhood.

Identification
The six of cups card can be identified by the six cups that are filled with flowers. The flowers have five points and they are white. Also in the picture, there is an older boy who seems to be smelling the flower while handing it to a younger girl. In the background of the photo, there is a figure walking away from the younger children which appears to be an older person. There is a house and a garden in the background as well. The main color of the image is yellow. Each of these symbols can be interpreted in different ways depending on who is interpreting them. Also there are certain card combinations that, if drawn with the Six of Cups during your reading, the card will be influenced in a certain way.

References

Suit of Cups